The ARIA Music Awards of 2019 are the 33rd Annual Australian Recording Industry Association Music Awards (generally known as ARIA Music Awards or simply The ARIAs) and consist of a series of awards, including the 2019 ARIA Artisan Awards, ARIA Hall of Fame Awards, and ARIA Fine Arts Awards and the ARIA Awards. The ARIA Awards ceremony were held on 27 November 2019 and broadcast from the Star Event Centre, Sydney around Australia on the Nine Network. Guy Sebastian hosted the ceremony, he also performed his track, "Choir", and won two categories.

On 24 September 2019 the Fine Arts and Artisan Award nominees were announced and the winners were determined on 10 October. ARIA had revealed the nominees for the ARIA Awards on 10 October. New categories were created for Best Hip Hop Release and Best Soul/R&B Release, which had previously been combined as Best Urban Release.

Australian four-piece vocal group Human Nature were inducted into the ARIA Hall of Fame. They performed a medley of their songs, "Don't Say Goodbye", "He Don't Love You", "Dancing in the Street" and "Everytime You Cry". Tones and I won the most awards, receiving four from eight nominations. The Teskey Brothers received seven nominations and won three categories; while Hilltop Hoods, also with seven nominations, obtained one trophy. Michael Chugg, a promoter and talent manager, received the ARIA Industry Icon Award.

Performers

Performers for the ARIA Awards ceremony:

ARIA Hall of Fame inductee

On 1 November an ARIA representative announced that Human Nature were to be inducted into their Hall of Fame. The group's members issued a joint statement, "All we have ever wanted to do for a career is to entertain people, and to have had the fans continually support us over the years both in our home of Australia and overseas, is really something we never dreamed of. To be inducted on the anniversary of our first ever performance as a group and in our 30th year since forming makes us so grateful."

Nominees and winners

ARIA Awards

Winners indicated in boldface, with other nominees in plain.

Public voted

Fine Arts Awards

Winners indicated in boldface, with other nominees in plain.

Artisan Awards

Winners indicated in boldface, with other nominees in plain.

References

External links
 

2019 in Australian music
2019 music awards
ARIA Music Awards